Turkey women's national goalball team is the women's national team of Turkey.  Goalball is a team sport designed specifically for athletes with a vision impairment.  It takes part in international competitions.

Current squad

Coach : Gültekin Karasu

Former players
Sadiye Ardıç (2012-2014)
Buket Atalay (2012-2016)
Kader Çelik (2017-2020)
Gülşah Düzgün (2012-2019)
Neşe Mercan (2012-2019)
Sümeyye Özcan (2012-2016)
Seda Yıldız (2013-2019)

Competitions and results

2020

The team competed in the 2020 Summer Paralympics, with competition from Wednesday 25 August to finals on Friday 3 September 2021, in the Makuhari Messe arena, Chiba, Tokyo, Japan.  They qualified by placing second at the 2018 IBSA Goalball World Championships.

Round-robin

Quarterfinal

Semifinal

Final

2021
The team competes in the 2021 IBSA Goalball European A Championships from 4 to 13 November 2021 in Samsun, Turkey. Turkey won the silver medal after losing to Russia 4–5 in the final.

Turkey team consisted of Fatma Gül Güler (#1), Reyhan Yılmaz (#2), Sevda Altunoluk (#3), Şeydanur Kaplan (#4), Sevtap Altunoluk (#7), Berfin Altan (#8) coached by Gültekin Karasu.

See also 

 Disabled sports 
 Turkey men's national goalball team 
 Turkey at the Paralympics

References

Goalball women's
National women's goalball teams
Turkey at the Paralympics
Goalball in Turkey
European national goalball teams